Axinaea is a genus of flowering plants in the family Melastomataceae. As of 2012, there are at least 42 species. They are small trees and shrubs. They are native to the Americas; almost all are found in the Andes.

Plants of this genus are pollinated when birds, several species of fruit-eating tanagers, consume specialized appendages on the stamens. As they grasp the nutritious appendages, a cloud of pollen is released. This has been called "puff pollination".

Species include:
Axinaea affinis (Naudin) Cogn. 
Axinaea carolinae-telleziae
Axinaea fernando-cabiesii
Axinaea flava
 Axinaea glauca
 Axinaea lawessonii E. Cotton
 Axinaea macrophylla (Naudin) Triana
 Axinaea merianiae (DC.) Triana
 Axinaea ninakurorum
 Axinaea nitida Cogn.
 Axinaea pauciflora Cogn.
 Axinaea quitensis Benoist
 Axinaea sclerophylla Triana
 Axinaea sessilifolia Triana
 Axinaea sodiroi Wurdack
Axinaea reginae

References

 
Melastomataceae genera
Taxonomy articles created by Polbot